Adam Niklewicz (born in 1957 in Zamość, Poland) is a Polish-born American sculptor who earned his BFA in graphic communications in 1989 from Washington University in St. Louis, and his MFA in sculpture from SUNY Purchase in 2006. His work has been featured and discussed in ARTnews, CNN Sculpture Magazine, Modern Painters, Art New England, The New York Times, and The Nation (in Poland – in Artpunkt, Exit, Format, and Obieg), among others.  He has shown at such venues as Grounds for Sculpture, Hudson Valley Center for Contemporary Art, Real Art Ways, the New Britain Museum of American Art, Black & White Gallery, Five Myles, Stamford Museum, Galerie fur Landschaftskunst (Hamburg, Germany),  Galeria Sztuki Wspolczesnej (Opole, Poland), and Zacheta (Warsaw, Poland).

Affiliated galleries and museums
Black & White Gallery / Project Space, Brooklyn, NY
Grounds for Sculpture / International Sculpture Center, Hamilton, New Jersey
Hudson Valley Center for Contemporary Art, Peekskill, NY
Real Art Ways, Hartford, CT
New Britain Museum of American Art, New Britain, CT
Wadsworth Atheneum Museum of Art, Hartford, Connecticut
Galerie fur Landschaftskunst, Hamburg, Germany
, Opole, Poland
Zacheta, Warsaw, Poland

References

External links

Smack Mellon, Brooklyn, NY
EBK Gallery, Hartford, CT
Ignant.de - Rain Activated Art
Ignant.de - Adam Niklewicz
Connecticut Artists Collection
An Interview with Adam Niklewicz

1957 births
Living people
American contemporary artists
20th-century American sculptors
Polish emigrants to the United States
Polish sculptors
Polish male sculptors
People from Zamość
Sam Fox School of Design & Visual Arts alumni
21st-century American sculptors
State University of New York at Purchase alumni
Washington University in St. Louis alumni